KEAS may refer to:

 Knots Equivalent Air Speed, a comparative airspeed corrected for the compressibility of air at high speed or high altitude
 KEAS (AM), a defunct radio station (1590 AM) formerly licensed to Eastland, Texas, United States
 KEAS Tabernacle Christian Methodist Episcopal Church

See also 
 KEA (disambiguation)